McKenzie is an unincorporated community in Burleigh County, North Dakota, United States. It lies approximately 20 miles east of Bismarck along I-94/US 83. McKenzie's ZIP code is 58572.

A post office called McKenzie was established in 1887, and remained in operation until 1965. The community was named after early North Dakota politician Alexander McKenzie.

References

Unincorporated communities in North Dakota
Unincorporated communities in Burleigh County, North Dakota